USS Arlington may refer to the following ships of the United States Navy:

  was a Cape Johnson-class transport.
  was a  that was renamed .
  is a  currently in commission.

United States Navy ship names